Miroslav Caban (* April 4, 1964, Brezno, Czechoslovakia) is a Slovak mountaineer and photographer currently living in the Czech Republic. Climbed the seven peaks of the seven continents .  In 2002, climbed the highest mountain in the world, Mount Everest without oxygen and 6 days after arrival to the base camp. He spent his youth in Liptov in Banska Bystrica. After completing his military service, he moved to Moravia, where he and his family today . He is married and has two children.

In 2001 he undertook an expedition to the most difficult mountain in the world K2, which climbed to a height of 8000 meters . The biggest success was the ascent without oxygen on Mount Everest in 2002. In 2004, climbed Kilimanjaro, Elbrus, Mount McKinley and Vinson Massif, in 2005, Puncak Jaya, Mount Kosciuszko and Aconcagua . The first Czechoslovak and second in the world and climbed without oxygen seven highest peaks in the project Seven Summits.
His hobbies include photography, especially panoramas countries visited and top prospects. He wrote a book Oyu & Everest, that recounts the story of a successful climb Cho- Oyu combination and Mount Everest .

References

1964 births
People from Brezno
Living people